Jones Lopes da Silva (born 14 October 1988), known as Jones Carioca, is a Brazilian footballer. Mainly a forward, he can also play as a winger or as an attacking midfielder.

Career
Born in Caratinga, Jones began his career in Bonsucesso team in 2009. Had a pass on loan, almost unnoticed by Northwest five months of Bauru. In January 2010 he was signed by Deportivo Maldonado, which de facto a proxy club for investor and football agent. Then he was hired even loaned by America-Rio de Janeiro state championship for football in 2010. He stood out and was one of the best players in the league in Rio. In August 2010 he was loaned to Cruzeiro, which Cruzeiro would received 30% transfer fee if Jones was successfully sold, followed the footstep of Wallyson.

Career statistics
(Correct )

Honours

Club
Bahia
Campeonato Baiano: 2012

ABC
Campeonato Potiguar: 2016
Copa RN: 2016

Avaí
Campeonato Catarinense: 2019

Individual
Campeonato Brasileiro Série C Top Scorer: 2016 (12 goals)

References

External links

1988 births
Living people
Brazilian footballers
Association football wingers
Association football forwards
Campeonato Brasileiro Série A players
Campeonato Brasileiro Série B players
Campeonato Brasileiro Série C players
Bonsucesso Futebol Clube players
Esporte Clube Noroeste players
America Football Club (RJ) players
Cruzeiro Esporte Clube players
Goiás Esporte Clube players
Esporte Clube Bahia players
Clube Náutico Capibaribe players
ABC Futebol Clube players
Avaí FC players
Süper Lig players
TFF First League players
Kardemir Karabükspor footballers
Giresunspor footballers
Brazilian expatriate footballers
Brazilian expatriate sportspeople in Turkey
Expatriate footballers in Turkey